The 1994 Tennessee gubernatorial election took place on November 8, 1994. The Democratic incumbent Ned McWherter was term-limited leaving the governorship an open seat. Republican Congressman Don Sundquist was elected  Governor of Tennessee, defeating Democratic nominee Phil Bredesen, the Mayor of Nashville. 

Bredesen succeeded Sundquist as governor in 2003. David Y. Copeland III unsuccessfully sought the Republican nomination, while Bill Morris and Steve Cohen unsuccessfully sought the Democratic nomination.

General election

References

Gubernatorial
1994
Tennessee
1994 in Tennessee